Eva or Eua is an archaeological location in the regional unit of Arcadia in the Peloponnese, Greece. It is mentioned as a village by Pausanias and its name is also attested by archaeological findings. It is located in the valley of the river Tanos (ancient Tanaos), below the north-eastern slopes of the Parnon mountain range, between the modern towns of Astros and Kato Doliana. It is close to the site of the Byzantine Monastery of Loukou.

Pausanias says that in Eva there was a hieron (sanctuary) of the physician Polemocrates. Excavations that started in the area in 1980 revealed the ruins of the villa of Herodes Atticus (2nd century AD). Spectacular findings came to light, among them  mosaics, inscriptions, statues and other works of art. In Pausanias there is no account of this magnificent villa, possibly because he had not visited the area. The ancient sanctuary of Polemocrates has not been located, but it is believed that it was in the place today occupied by the nearby monastery.

References

 Spyropoulos, G. (2001). Drei Meisterwerke Der Griechischen Plastik Aus Der Villa Des Herodes Atticus Zu Eva/Loukou. P. Lang. .

Ancient Greek archaeological sites in Peloponnese (region)
Buildings and structures in Arcadia, Peloponnese
Former populated places in Greece
Geography of Peloponnese (region)